Ferdinando Del Sole (born 17 January 1998) is an Italian professional footballer who plays as a winger for  club Potenza on loan from Juventus.

Club career

Pescara 
Del Sole is a youth exponent from Pescara. He made his Serie B debut on 27 August 2017 against Foggia.

Loan to Juve Stabia 
On 15 July 2019, he joined Serie B side Juve Stabia on loan from Juventus.

Juventus U23 
On 19 January 2020, Del Sole played his first game for Juventus U23, the reserve team of Juventus, in a 1–0 Serie C win against Arezzo.

Potenza
On 1 September 2022, Del Sole was loaned to Potenza for two seasons.

Honours 
Juventus U23
 Coppa Italia Serie C: 2019–20

References

External links 
 

1998 births
Living people
Footballers from Naples
Italian footballers
Association football wingers
Serie B players
Serie C players
Juventus F.C. players
Delfino Pescara 1936 players
S.S. Juve Stabia players
Juventus Next Gen players
Ancona-Matelica players
Potenza Calcio players
Italy youth international footballers